Anand Sahib (Gurmukhi: ਅਨੰਦ ਸਾਹਿਬ anada sāhiba) is a collection of hymns in Sikhism, written in the Ramkali Raag by Guru Amar Das Ji, the third Guru of the Sikhs. It appears on the pages 917 to 922 in Guru Granth Sahib Ji. The word Anand means complete happiness.

The Anand Sahib is a part of the Nitnem (daily prayers) which are read by Amritdhari Sikhs before dawn. Anand Sahib is chanted at all the religious ceremonies of the Sikhs irrespective of the nature of the event.  There are two versions of Anand Sahib: one which extends 40 pauries and one shorter version often called Chhota Anand Sahib which comprises the first five pauries and then skips to the last one. This shorter version of Anand Sahib is usually recited at the closing ceremonies before Ardas. The Chhota Anand Sahib is included at the end of Rehras Sahib.

Anand Sahib, alongside Panj Granthi's (five chosen texts) Dakhni Oankar and Sidh Gosht are written in Raga Ramkali—the Raga of the coincides with part of the night before sunrise or perhaps the first part of the day after sunrise.

References

External links
Read Anand Sahib Bani in Punjabi

Adi Granth
Sikh terminology
Sikh scripture